Antarctodolops is an extinct genus of polydolopimorphian metatherian similar to, but not closely related to, the living shrew opossums. It lived on Seymour Island, Antarctica in the Eocene. Two species, Antarctodolops dailyi and Antarctodolops mesetaense, have been found. These species were different sizes, with A. mesetaense being the larger.

References

Prehistoric marsupial genera
Eocene marsupials
Prehistoric vertebrates of Antarctica